Kourosh Khani (born 3 July 1989) is an Iranian racing driver.

Biography
Kourosh dominated numerous karting championships in his home country before moving to the UK in 2006. In 2007 Kourosh entered the British Formula Ford Championship.

In 2012 Khani graduated to the FIA Formula Two Championship, competing in four rounds and scoring two points.

Kourosh competed in the end of season testing for the GP3 Series in 2014, driving for Hilmer Motorsport, however he did not secure a full-time seat for 2015.

Racing record

References

External links
 
 

1989 births
Living people
Iranian racing drivers
FIA Formula Two Championship drivers
Ginetta GT4 Supercup drivers
Formula Renault BARC drivers